Slobodan Bitević (born 17 August 1988 in Alibunar, Serbia) is a Serbian karate athlete competing in kumite +84 kg division.

Achievements 
2017
  Karate1 Series A - Salzburg – 7–9 September, Salzburg, AUT – kumite +84 kg
  European Karate Championships – 4-7 May, Kocaeli, TUR – kumite +84 kg
2016
  Karate1 Premier League - Hamburg – 23–25 September, Hamburg, GER – kumite +84 kg
  Karate1 Premier League - Salzburg – 15–17 April, Salzburg, AUT – kumite +84 kg
  Karate Balkan Seniors Championship – 27-28 February, Istanbul, TUR – kumite +84 kg
2015
  European Karate Championships – 19–22 March, Istanbul, TUR – kumite +84
  Karate Balkan Seniors Championship – 21-22 February, Čačak, SRB – kumite +84 kg
2014
  Karate1 Premier League – Grand Final – 11-13 October, Salzburg, AUT – kumite +84 kg
  European Karate Championships – 1-4 May, Tampere, FIN – kumite +84 kg
2013
  Karate1 Premier League – Grand Final – 30 November, Salzburg, AUT – kumite +84 kg
2012
  European Karate Championships – 10–13 May, Adeje, ESP – kumite –84 kg
  Karate Balkan Seniors Championship – 16-18 March, Herceg Novi, MON – kumite –84 kg
2011
  European Karate Championships – 6–9 May, Zürich, SUI – kumite –84 kg
2010
  World Karate Championships – 27–31 October, Belgrade, SRB – kumite team
  World Karate Championships – 27–31 October, Belgrade, SRB – kumite –84 kg
  Karate Balkan Seniors Championship – 24-26 September, Loutraki, GRE – kumite –84 kg
2008
  European Karate Championships – 5–8 February, Tallinn, EST – kumite –80 kg

References

Sportspeople from Pančevo
1988 births
Living people
Serbian male karateka
Mediterranean Games bronze medalists for Serbia
Mediterranean Games medalists in karate
Competitors at the 2013 Mediterranean Games
Competitors at the 2018 Mediterranean Games
European Games competitors for Serbia
European champions for Serbia
Karateka at the 2015 European Games
Karateka at the 2019 European Games
21st-century Serbian people